Azim Premji University is an Indian, non-profit, private university, located in Bengaluru, Karnataka.  It was established by the Azim Premji University Act (2010) and recognised by the University Grants Commission under Section 2F.  Its stated purpose is Education for Social Change'.  

The university started offering postgraduate programmes in 2011 and undergraduate programmes in 2015 along with a host of other short-term diplomas and certificate courses. Its mandate is to run teaching programmes and conduct research to contribute to the social sector in India and to be an exemplar higher education institution demonstrating inclusion and quality.

A second Azim Premji University in Bhopal will be operational by Dec 2022. Two more universities are being planned in the northeast and Ranchi in India.

 Courses offered 
The university currently offers five postgraduate programmes – M.A. in Education, M.A. in Economics, M.A. in Development, M.A. in Public Policy & Governance and LL.M. (Law and Development), seven 3-year bachelors programmes - B.A. English, B.A. History, B.A. Philosophy, B.A. Economics, B.Sc. Biology, B.Sc. Mathematics, B.Sc. Physics, and three 4-year integrated B.Sc./B.Ed. programmes in Biology, Mathematics, and Physics. The programmes are full-time and residential, based in Bengaluru.

History
The university was established by the Azim Premji Foundation. 

The Azim Premji Foundation was to be funded solely by Azim Premji by way of transfer of his personal shares to the Foundation. The objective of the funding was to facilitate universalisation of primary education rather than serve as a constraint in achieving it. The Foundation began its work in Karnataka and Andhra Pradesh in 2001 where the state leadership and education departments were supportive of its mandate.

Campus

The university's campus is located on 90 acres spread around Sarjapur-Attibelle Road.

The campus offers a  space of 2.6 million square feet  with classrooms and residential facilities for students, faculty and guests. The campus includes a library, seminar halls, an open-air amphitheatre, outdoor play fields and an indoor sports complex.

Academics
The university is organized into 5 schools and a university wide research centre.The university offers post graduate programmes in Education, Development,  Law and Development, Economics and Public Policy. The university also offers eight undergraduate degrees including degrees in science — Physics, Biology or Mathematics, History, Philosophy, Literature, Economics and a BSc. BEd. dual-degree (in Physics, Biology or Mathematics).

Student life

Aspects of student life include:

 In “Pahal”, students engage with social causes ranging from the education of disadvantaged children, working with the community surrounding the campus, environmental concerns, blood donation camps etc.
 The “Kaapi Aur Charcha” series invites practitioners from various fields to engage in informal talks with the students.
 Publications: Student publications “Karvan” and “Student Journal of Education and Development”.
 UNMUKT, the annual cultural festival.
 Clubs including cinema, theatre, literature, quiz, photography, and sports.
 “Debating Development” is a forum to debate contemporary social issues.

Research

Research for Social Impact
The emphasis of the research is on contributing to practice on the ground in India's vast social sector and on high-quality academic scholarship in the areas of development, education, public policy, governance, sustainability, and equity.

Centre for Climate Change and Sustainability
The centre seeks to strengthen India's response to the climate crisis. Set up in 2019, the centre uses research, education, and sustainability actions to address the challenges of climate change. This includes research on climate change and urban sustainability, publication of books, research papers, and popular articles as well as the fostering of research-based climate action through an annual call for external research proposals on climate change and sustainability. Recent publications include Cities and Canopies: Trees in Indian Cities, Where have all our Gunda thopes gone''.

Centre for Sustainable Employment
Established in 2017, the centre aims at generating and supporting research in the areas of job creation, employment, and sustainable livelihoods. The centre conducts primary surveys exploring a range of labour market issues including measurement of work, discrimination in the labour market, the impact of COVID-19 on workers, NREGA and the Urban Employment Guarantee Scheme. SWI 2018, the first State of Working India (SWI) report, provided a comprehensive overview of India's labour market. SWI 2019 put together four policy papers to examine the possibilities for employment creation through an urban jobs guarantee programme and universal basic services provisioning while demonstrating the scope for fiscal expansion and the imperative need for a well-articulated industrial policy. SWI 2021 looked at the devastating impact of the pandemic on India's labour market including the disproportionate impact on women and young workers and the implications for poverty and inequality in the country.

 Centre for Local Democracy 
The centre, set up in 2020, engages in multiple areas of action, including research grants; a local democracy pilot project in Jharkhand initiated to create and disseminate inspiring stories of local democracy in practice and offering a Continuing Education Programme, ‘Local Democracy: Theory Policy and Practice’.

Research Funding Programme
This programme is part of Azim Premji University's efforts to strengthen and elevate the understanding of societal processes and outcomes. It is designed to promote inquiry into areas of particular interest to the Azim Premji Foundation and to explore possible responses for some of them. The Research Funding Programme is designed to strengthen and supplement existing efforts in these areas. While they are open to any broad consideration within an area, the research should be empirically grounded, and be able to inform practice and policy.

Placement
More than 2300 graduates have gone on to find work that is meaningful and impactful. About 90% of the students work in the social sector and 80% work in disadvantaged parts of India at the grassroots. Over 300 organisations participate in campus placements. These include large NGOs, small grassroots organisations, research institutions, policy bodies, CSR groups, government and quasi-government institutions and schools.

 Alumni 
Eight cohorts of about 2300 students from the master's programmes have graduated and almost 100% of them have received job offers on campus or outside from a range of organizations. Including the graduates of 2021, the total strength of alumni is 2700''' of which 87% are from PG and 13% from UG programmes.

Translations 
Among the largest of such initiatives in the country, the Translations Initiative, Anuvada Sampada, facilitates the reach of high-quality learning material in higher education to graduate and PG students in Indian languages (currently, Hindi and Kannada). The initiative has a network of 450 translators in 20 leading academic institutions. The belief that led to this initiative is that the availability of quality resources in Indian languages will support students to engage more deeply and thoroughly with concepts and ideas in higher education.

Schoolbooks Archive 
The Schoolbooks Archive, launched November 2021, is a free, open-access, digital collection of 5,724 items, schoolbooks and related documents, dating as far back as 1819, from various regions of South Asia. The archive covers books in all languages and all school subjects that have been written and/or published in the Indian Subcontinent – India and neighbouring South Asian countries. As part of this initiative, a physical exhibition is being held in different parts of the country.

References

External links
https://azimpremjiuniversity.edu.in
https://azimpremjiuniversity.edu.in/SitePages/admissions-programme-ug-programme.aspx#
https://azimpremjifoundation.org

Publishingnext.in. http://www.publishingnext.in/publishing-next-industry-awards-2020/

  Hindustan Times. Review: Cities and Canopies: Trees in Indian Cities by Harini Nagendra and Seema Mundoli. June 28, 2019. 
 https://www.hindustantimes.com/books/review-cities-and-canopies-trees-in-indian-cities-by-harini-nagendra-and-seema-mundoli/story-ZErLTOdzpDfw9pb6OK1i5I.html

  The Indian Express. A new book by two Bengaluru-based ecologists tries to help urban Indians rediscover trees as guardians. June 30, 2019. https://indianexpress.com/article/express-sunday-eye/a-two-bengaluru-based-ecologists-help-urban-indians-rediscover-trees-guardians-5805436/

  Times of India. COVID-19 underscores MGNREGA's role as a safety net. Nov.20,2022. https://timesofindia.indiatimes.com/blogs/developing-contemporary-india/covid-19-underscores-mgnregas-role-as-a-safety-net/

  The Economic Times. One year of COVID pushes 230 million Indians into poverty: Azim Premji University. May 5, 2021. https://economictimes.indiatimes.com/news/economy/indicators/one-year-of-covid-pushed-230-million-indians-into-poverty-azim-premji-university/articleshow/82408369.cms?from=mdr

  Financial Express. Need cash support, more rural jobs to tackle Covid impact: Azim Premji University. May 6, 2021. https://www.financialexpress.com/economy/need-cash-support-more-rural-jobs-to-tackle-covid-impact-azim-premji-university/2246774/

  Bangalore Mirror. Azim Premji University presents its first ‘State of Working. Oct 4, 2018. https://bangaloremirror.indiatimes.com/bangalore/others/azim-premji-university-presents-its-first-state-of-working-india-report/articleshow/66074985.cms

  The Indian Express. Extending MGNREGA to urban areas will create 50 million jobs: State Of Working India 2019 report. April 16, 2019. https://indianexpress.com/article/cities/bangalore/extending-mgnrega-to-urban-areas-will-create-50-million-jobs-state-of-working-india-2019-report-azim-premji-university-5679205/

  Business Today. COVID-19 first wave pushed 23 crore Indians into poverty: Azim Premji University. May 6, 2021. https://www.businesstoday.in/jobs/story/covid-19-first-wave-pushed-23-crore-indians-into-poverty-azim-premji-university-295173-2021-05-06

  Fundsforngos.org. Azim Premji University's Research Grant Programme: Strengthening the Understanding of Societal Processes. Jan 30, 2018. https://www2.fundsforngos.org/latest-funds-for-ngos/azim-premji-universitys-research-grant-programme-strengthening-the-understanding-of-societal-processes/

  Concoursn.com. Azim Premji University launches Research Funding Programme (India). Oct 31, 2020. https://concoursn.com/azim-premji-university-launches-research-funding-programme-india/

  Ngobox.org. Applications invited for Research Funding Programme 2021. https://ngobox.org/full_grant_announcement_Applications-Invited-for-Research-Funding-Programme-2021-Azim-Premji-Foundation_6811

  Linked.in. https://www.linkedin.com/company/placements-cell-azim-premji-university/about/

Universities in Bangalore
Educational institutions established in 2010
2010 establishments in Karnataka